Filipe Miguel Lopes Fernandes (born 5 March 1980) is a Portuguese footballer who plays for Águias do Moradal as a defensive midfielder.

Club career
He made his professional debut in the Segunda Liga for Campomaiorense on 28 October 2001 in a game against Penafiel.

References

External links

1980 births
People from Castelo Branco, Portugal
Living people
Portuguese footballers
Association football midfielders
Sport Benfica e Castelo Branco players
S.C. Campomaiorense players
Liga Portugal 2 players
Cypriot Second Division players
F.C. Marco players
Gil Vicente F.C. players
AEK Larnaca FC players
Portuguese expatriate footballers
Expatriate footballers in Cyprus
Portuguese expatriate sportspeople in Cyprus
S.C. Covilhã players
Sportspeople from Castelo Branco District